Henry Ausman was a member of the Wisconsin State Assembly.

Biography
Ausman was born in Germany on October 20, 1836 to John H. and Anna M. (Weigand) Ausman. He immigrated with his parents to Venango County (now Forest County) Pennsylvania in 1848. He moved to Dunn County, Wisconsin in 1860 and settled in Spring Brook, Wisconsin. Ausman worked for Knapp, Stout & Co. and farmed in the area before entering into various businesses. In 1865, he became an Evangelical minister.

On August 4, 1855, Ausman married Martha Elizabeth Sippel. They had eleven children. Ausman died on December 4, 1924.

Ausman's great grandson, La Verne Ausman, was a member of the Wisconsin State Assembly and an official in the Farmers Home Administration and the United States Department of Agriculture.

Political career
Ausman represented Dunn County in Wisconsin's 32nd State Assembly in 1879. Other positions he held included Chairman (similar to mayor) and Town Treasurer of Elk Mound (town), Wisconsin and County Commissioner (similar to county supervisor) of Dunn County. He was a Republican.

References

External links

People from Dunn County, Wisconsin
Republican Party members of the Wisconsin State Assembly
Mayors of places in Wisconsin
City and town treasurers in the United States
County supervisors in Wisconsin
Converts to evangelical Christianity
Religious leaders from Wisconsin
Businesspeople from Wisconsin
Farmers from Wisconsin
1836 births
1924 deaths
Burials in Wisconsin
People from Elk Mound, Wisconsin